Tami Maida was the groundbreaking junior varsity quarterback at Philomath High School in Philomath, Oregon. In 1981, she became the first known quarterback to also become homecoming princess. After a year at Philomath, she and her family moved back to their hometown of Prince George, British Columbia.

Her story was the basis of the CBS movie Quarterback Princess, with Helen Hunt as Maida.

References

External links
Football Players who were Homecoming Queens
A History of Girls Playing Tackle Football

High school football players in the United States
Canadian players of American football
Living people
Sportspeople from Prince George, British Columbia
Female players of American football
People from Philomath, Oregon
Year of birth missing (living people)